Mont Nebo is a hamlet in Saskatchewan.

Canwood No. 494, Saskatchewan
Unincorporated communities in Saskatchewan
Division No. 16, Saskatchewan